Yang Changjun (Chinese: 楊昌濬; 1825 – 1897) was a Governor General in Qing dynasty China. He commanded the armies of the Qing dynasty during the Dungan Revolt (1895). His subordinates included Tang Yanhe, Dong Fuxiang, and various other generals.

References

1825 births
1897 deaths
People from Xiangtan
Qing dynasty generals
Generals from Hunan
Viceroys of Min-Zhe
Viceroys of Shaan-Gan